is one of the seven wards of Fukuoka city in Japan. The ward is located in the center of the city.

It includes Tenjin and Daimyō which are among the largest downtown areas in Kyūshū, Nagahama, which is known for its fish market, and Ōhori Park.

Main facilities
 Fukuoka Art Museum
 Fukuoka Municipal Zoo and Botanical Garden
 Fukuoka PayPay Dome
 Fukuoka Kyuden Kinen Gymnasium
 Acros Fukuoka

Gallery

See also

 Kūkō Line (Fukuoka City Subway)
 Nanakuma Line
 Tenjin Omuta Line
 Love FM (Japan)
 Nakasu
 Kōki Hirota
 Fukuoka Japan Temple of the LDS Church
 New Otani Hotels

References

External links

Wards of Fukuoka
Underground cities